SPIKES is an athletics website and magazine published by Haymarket Network in conjunction with the IAAF.

History and profile
The magazine and website were launched  in July 2008 at an event attended by then IAAF vice president Lord Coe, Steve Ovett, Jonathan Edwards, Colin Jackson and Wilson Kipketer.

The aim of SPIKES is to raise awareness of the sport and recognition of the athletes by encouraging discussion through challenging features and profiles. Although funded directly by the IAAF, the editorial staff has a free rein with the content – which typically combines serious debate with more light-hearted features and pop cultural references. Giles Richards of The Observer praised the magazine for its interviews and biographical features: "It's a lot easier to care about a sport if you care about the people involved".

In 2014 SPIKES moved to its new home on the IAAF website (spikes.iaaf.org) and with digital taking over the magazine format to ensure content is available to everyone and everywhere around the world.

SPIKES is universally known as the fun, relaxed and engaged voice of athletics and has established itself as one of the most influential voices in the sport of track and field. It publishes stories from athletes and events around the world to bring fans closer than ever to the sport they love and to inspire the next generation of athletics enthusiasts.

References

External links 
 SPIKES website 

2008 establishments in the United Kingdom
Athletics magazines
Sports magazines published in the United Kingdom
Magazines established in 2008
Magazines published in London